The Calabria pine vole (Microtus brachycercus) is a vole found in southern and central Italy initially described by Lehmann as a subspecies of M. savii. Genetic tests in the Calabrian region found, although similar, the X chromosome is larger than that of samples of M. savii found elsewhere in Italy and the Y chromosome is twice the size, leading Galleni in 1994 to designate M. brachycercus as a separate species.

References

 D.E. Wilson & D.M. Reeder, 2005: Mammal Species of the World: A Taxonomic and Geographic Reference. Third Edition. The Johns Hopkins University Press, Baltimore..

Microtus
Rodents of Europe
Endemic fauna of Italy
Mammals described in 1961